Barium tungstate is an inorganic chemical compound of barium and the tungstate anion.

Synthesis and properties 
Barium tungstate can be obtained from the precipitation reaction between barium nitrate and ammonium paratungstate or sodium tungstate.

Ba(NO3)2 + Na2WO4 → BaWO4↓ + 2 NaNO3

It is a white solid, which at normal conditions forms tetragonal crystals similar to scheelite, CaWO4. Under pressures above 7 GPa, the compound undergoes transformation to a monoclinic structure similar to fergusonite, YNbO4.

Uses 
Barium tungstate can be used as a frequency shifter in laser technology. It has uses in X-ray photography and as a pigment.

References 

Barium compounds
Tungstates